Brijendrapal Singh, better known as B. P. Singh is an Indian television producer born in Dehradun, India. He is the creator and director-producer of the Indian TV series CID (19842018), one of the longest-running TV series in India, which started the CID Gallantry Awards in 2010. He has also played an occasional role of D.C.P. Shamsher Singh Chitrole in C.I.D..

He also produced Sony TV's horror series Aahat (19952015).

On 8 October 2004, a special episode, "The Inheritance" / C.I.D. 111, to mark the completion of six years of CID, was shot in a single continuous shot for 111 minutes (one hour and 51 minutes), which landed the show in the Limca Book of Records and Guinness World Record for "TV show - longest continual shot". He has also served as the Chairman of Film and Television Institute of India (FTII).

Career
Singh originally belongs to Dehradun and studied at Film and Television Institute of India, Pune. He started his career working with state TV-channel Doordarshan in 1973 as a news cameraman and went on to handle the camera for another 10 years, before relocating to Mumbai. He made murder mystery TV film for Doordarshan, Sirf Char Din, while preparing for that film, he started visiting the Crime Branch of police, and befriended Inspector Jayant Wagle, and in the process developed a lifelong interest in detective work. He subsequently produced the TV series, Ek Shunya Shunya for Doordarshan in 1980's, before relocating to Mumbai where he made a few Marathi serials for Doordarshan.

The horror series Aahat was first shot in 1994 as a suspense thriller, and it started being aired in 1995, but after about 40 episodes with the same theme, one episode on supernatural theme was made and when TRPs of the series rose sharply, it made the switch.

Turning point in career came with beginning of Sony TV channel, and started shooting C.I.D., started on Sony TV in 1984, about a team of detectives working for the Crime Investigation Department (CID) in Mumbai and is still on. He even introduced India's first silent comedy Gutur Gu in 2010.

He also started crime show on Life OK named Hum Ne Li Hai - Shapath which is about  police inspectors and a social worker. This show was gaining good TRPs and is BP Singh's second crime show .

Filmography 

Web Series

Television

References

External links
 

Living people
Film producers from Mumbai
Businesspeople from Dehradun
Indian television directors
Indian television producers
Film and Television Institute of India alumni
1935 births